Julia Kijowska (born ) is a Polish actress. Her notable films include In Darkness (2011), The Mighty Angel (2014), and United States of Love (2016). The daughter of the director , she studied acting at the Aleksander Zelwerowicz National Academy of Dramatic Art in Warsaw and began her career in theatre productions.

Life and career
Julia Kijowska was born in March 1981 in Warsaw. A daughter of the Polish director , she completed her training as an actress in 2005 at the Aleksander Zelwerowicz National Academy of Dramatic Art and began acting in theatre productions. Beginning in 2008, she appeared in Polish film productions, making her debut in a feature film with roles in  0_1_0 and Boisko bezdomnych. Her notable films include In Darkness (2011), The Mighty Angel (2014), and United States of Love (2016).

Awards
In 2007, Julia Kijowska received the award "Feliks Warszawski" in the category: best leading female role for the role of Una in the play "Blackbird". Kijowska's work has been recognised with several awards, including the Best Actor award at the 2012 Thessaloniki International Film Festival for her role in Miłość and the 2014 Special Awards of the Polish Ministry of Culture and National Heritage. In 2018, she was given a special recognition by the jury of the Zbigniew Cybulski Award.

Filmography

References

1981 births
Actresses from Warsaw
Polish stage actresses
Polish film actresses
Polish television actresses
Aleksander Zelwerowicz National Academy of Dramatic Art in Warsaw alumni
21st-century Polish actresses
Living people